Greg Barden (born 8 February 1981 in Perth, Western Australia, Australia) is a British Entrepreneur who founded the discovery, payment and reward platform Pixie. Barden is also the CEO of the company.

Career

After School, Barden at the age of 16 joined the Royal Marines where he served in 45 Commando seeing service in  Kosovo. At the age 20 Barden became the youngest person to complete United Kingdom Special Forces Selection and join the Special Boat Service (SBS) seeing service in Afghanistan, Iraq and other countries across the world.

In 2007, Barden having served in the UK military for 11 years, joined Bristol Rugby as a rugby union player in the Guinness Premiership. He played as a centre. In 2009 Barden got picked to play for the England Rugby Sevens where he would eventually be named as Captain for 2011/12 season.

In May 2012, Barden retired from professional rugby and founded Pixie.

Club career

He has 12 caps for the Royal Navy rugby team and two caps for the Combined Services. He was picked to play for the England Rugby Sevens squad in 2009 where they beat New Zealand in London. His fifth career try in the IRB Sevens World Series came during the final game of 2009-10 when England lost 15–12 to Samoa in Edinburgh at the end of May. He was picked for the England 7's team for the 2010 Commonwealth Games in Delhi. He was named England sevens captain for the 2011/2012 season.

External links
 http://stories.pixieapp.co/about/
 http://www.skysports.com/rugby-union/news/12504/7325656/Barden-to-skipper-England

1981 births
Australian expatriate sportspeople in England
Australian rugby union players
Bristol Bears players
Living people
Royal Navy rugby union players
Commonwealth Games rugby sevens players of England
Rugby sevens players at the 2010 Commonwealth Games
Rugby union players from Perth, Western Australia
Rugby union centres